Harry Hansen (born 14 January 1919 in Bergen, died 5 September 2003) was a Norwegian politician for the Labour Party.

He was elected to the Norwegian Parliament from Buskerud in 1969, and was re-elected on two occasions. He had previously served as a deputy representative during the term 1954–1957.

On the local level he was a member of Bergen city council from 1951 to 1969, serving as deputy mayor from 1955 to 1959 and mayor from 1963 to 1969.

References

1919 births
2003 deaths
Members of the Storting
Labour Party (Norway) politicians
Mayors of Bergen
20th-century Norwegian politicians